Adamsville is a census-designated place (CDP) in Crawford County, Pennsylvania, United States. The population was 67 at the 2010 census, down from 117 in 2000.

Geography
Adamsville is located in southwestern Crawford County at  (41.510643, -80.369802), in southern West Fallowfield Township. Pennsylvania Route 18 passes through the community, leading north  to Hartstown and south  to Greenville.

Demographics

As of the census of 2000, there were 117 people, 49 households, and 39 families residing in the CDP. The population density was 698.4 people per square mile (265.7/km2). There were 54 housing units at an average density of 322.4/sq mi (122.6/km2). The racial makeup of the CDP was 100.00% White.

There were 49 households, out of which 28.6% had children under the age of 18 living with them, 65.3% were married couples living together, 8.2% had a female householder with no husband present, and 20.4% were non-families. 20.4% of all households were made up of individuals, and 14.3% had someone living alone who was 65 years of age or older. The average household size was 2.39 and the average family size was 2.72.

In the CDP the population was spread out, with 19.7% under the age of 18, 7.7% from 18 to 24, 28.2% from 25 to 44, 22.2% from 45 to 64, and 22.2% who were 65 years of age or older. The median age was 42 years. For every 100 females there were 105.3 males. For every 100 females age 18 and over, there were 91.8 males.

The median income for a household in the CDP was $29,821, and the median income for a family was $34,167. Males had a median income of $32,500 versus $16,250 for females. The per capita income for the CDP was $17,351. None of the population and none of the families were below the poverty line.

References

Census-designated places in Crawford County, Pennsylvania